Ableism (also known as ablism, disablism (British English), anapirophobia, anapirism, and disability discrimination) is discrimination and social prejudice against people with disabilities or who are perceived to be disabled. Ableism characterizes people as defined by their disabilities and inferior to the non-disabled. On this basis, people are assigned or denied certain perceived abilities, skills, or character orientations.

Although ableism and disablism are both terms which describe disability discrimination, the emphasis for each of these terms is slightly different. Ableism is discrimination in favor of non-disabled people, while disablism is discrimination against disabled people.

There are stereotypes which are either associated with disability in general, or they are associated with specific impairments or chronic health conditions (for instance the presumption that all disabled people want to be cured, the presumption that wheelchair users also have an intellectual disability, or the presumption that blind people have some special form of insight). These stereotypes, in turn, serve as a justification for discriminatory practices, and reinforce discriminatory attitudes and behaviors toward people who are disabled. Labeling affects people when it limits their options for action or changes their identity.

In ableist societies, the lives of disabled people is considered less worth living, or disabled people less valuable, even sometimes expendable. The eugenics movement of the early 20th century is considered an expression of widespread ableism.

Ableism can be further understood by reading literature which is written and published by those who experience disability and ableism first-hand. Disability studies is an academic discipline which is also beneficial when non-disabled people pursue it in order to gain a better understanding of ableism.

Etymology
Originating from -able (in disable, disabled) and -ism (in racism, sexism); first recorded in 1981.

History

Canada 
Ableism in Canada refers to a set of discourses, behaviors, and structures that express feelings of anxiety, fear, hostility, and antipathy towards people with disabilities in Canada.

The specific types of discrimination that have occurred or are still occurring in Canada include the inability to access important facilities such as infrastructure within the transport network, restrictive immigration policies, involuntary sterilization to stop people with disabilities from having offspring, barriers to employment opportunities, wages that are insufficient to maintain a minimal standard of living, and institutionalization of people with disabilities in substandard conditions.

Austerity measures implemented by the government of Canada have also at times been referred to as ableist, such as funding cuts that put people with disabilities at risk of living in abusive arrangements.

Nazi Germany 
In July 1933, Hitler, along with the Nazi Government, implemented the Law for the Prevention of Progeny with Hereditary Diseased Offspring. Essentially, this law implemented sterilization practices for all people who had what were considered hereditary disabilities. For example, disabilities such as mental illness, blindness and deafness were all considered hereditary diseases; therefore, people with these disabilities were sterilized. The law also created propaganda against people with disabilities; people with disabilities were displayed as unimportant towards progressing the Aryan race.

In 1939 Hitler signed the secret euthanasia program decree Aktion T4, which authorized the killing of selected patients diagnosed with chronic neurological and psychiatric disorders. This program killed about 70,000 disabled people before it was officially halted by Hitler in 1941 under public pressure, and it was unofficially continued out of the public eye, killing a total of 200,000 or more by the end of Hitler's reign in 1945.

United Kingdom

In the UK, disability discrimination became unlawful as a result of the Disability Discrimination Act 1995, and the Disability Discrimination Act 2005. These were later superseded, retaining the substantive law, by the Equality Act 2010. The Equality Act 2010 brought together protections against multiple areas of discriminatory behavior (disability, race, religion and belief, sex, sexual orientation, gender identity, age and pregnancy the so-called "protected characteristics").

Under the Equality Act of 2010, there are prohibitions addressing several forms of discrimination including direct discrimination (s.13), indirect discrimination (s.6, s.19), harassment (s.26), victimisation (s.27), discrimination arising from disability (s.15), and failure to make reasonable adjustments (s.20).

Part 2, Chapter 1, Section 6, of the Equality Act 2010 states that "A person (P) has a disability if (a) P has a physical or mental impairment, and (b) the impairment has a substantial and long-term adverse effect on P's ability to carry out normal day-to-day activities."

United States
Much like many minority groups, disabled Americans were often segregated and denied certain rights for a majority of American history. In the 1800s, a shift from a religious view to a more scientific view took place and caused more individuals with disabilities to be examined. Public stigma began to change after World War II when many Americans returned home with disabilities. In the 1960s, following the civil rights movement in America, the world began the disabled rights movement. The movement was intended to give all individuals with disabilities equal rights and opportunities. Until the 1970s, ableism in the United States was often codified into law. For example, in many jurisdictions, so-called "ugly laws" barred people from appearing in public if they had diseases or disfigurements that were considered unsightly.

Rehabilitation Act of 1973 
Section 504 and other sections of the Rehabilitation Act of 1973 enacted into law certain civil penalties for failing to make public places comply with access codes known as the ADA Access Guidelines (ADAAG). These laws prohibit direct discrimination against disabled people in government programs, employment, public transit, and public accommodations like stores and restaurants.

Voting Accessibility for the Elderly and Handicapped Act of 1984
The Voting Accessibility for the Elderly and Handicapped Act was passed to promote the fundamental right to vote by improving access for elderly individuals and people with disabilities to registration facilities and polling places for Federal elections by requiring access to polling places used in Federal elections and available registration and voting aids, such as instructions in large type

Fair Housing Amendments Act of 1988 
The federal Fair Housing Amendments Act of 1988 prohibits housing discrimination on the basis of mental or physical disability and requires that newly constructed multi-family housing meet certain access guidelines while requiring landlords to allow disabled persons to modify existing dwellings for accessibility. It was an amendment for Title VIII of the Civil Rights Act of 1968. The law also protects people with mental disabilities by prohibiting discrimination in housing and allowing people with mental illness or any other disability to live where they choose.

Americans with Disabilities Act of 1990 
The Americans with Disabilities Act of 1990 (ADA) was passed on July 26, 1990, during the George H. W. Bush administration and amended on January 1, 2009. The act gave individuals with disabilities civil rights protections.

Individuals with Disabilities Education Act 
The Individuals with Disabilities Education Act (IDEA) ensures students with a disability are provided with Free Appropriate Public Education (FAPE) that is tailored to their individual needs. IDEA was previously known as the Education for All Handicapped Children Act (EHA) from 1975 to 1990. In 1990, the United States Congress reauthorized EHA and changed the title to IDEA (Public Law No. 94-142). Overall, the goal of IDEA is to provide children with disabilities the same opportunity for education as those students who do not have a disability.

UN Convention on the Rights of Persons with Disabilities 
In May 2012, the UN Convention on the Rights of Persons with Disabilities was ratified. The document establishes the inadmissibility of discrimination on the basis of disability, including in employment. In addition, the amendments create a legal basis for significantly expanding opportunities to protect the rights of persons with disabilities, including in the administrative procedure and in court. The law defined specific obligations that all owners of facilities and service providers must fulfill to create conditions for disabled people equal to the rest.

Workplace 
In 1990, the Americans with Disabilities Act was put in place to prohibit private employers, state and local government, employment agencies and labor unions from discrimination against qualified disabled people in job applications, when hiring, firing, advancement in workplace, compensation, training, and on other terms, conditions and privileges of employment. The U.S. Equal Employment Opportunity Commission (EEOC) plays a part in fighting against ableism by being responsible for enforcing federal laws that make it illegal to discriminate against a job applicant or an employee because of the person's race, color, religion, sex (including pregnancy, gender identity, and sexual orientation), national origin, age (40 or older), disability or genetic information. 

Similarly in the UK, the Equality Act 2010 was put in place and provides legislation that there should be no workplace discrimination. Under the act, all employers have a duty to make reasonable adjustments for their disabled employees to help them overcome any disadvantages resulting from the impairment. Failure to carry out reasonable adjustment amounts to disability discrimination.

Employers and managers are often concerned about the potential cost associated with providing accommodations to employees with disabilities. However, many accommodations have a cost of $0 (59% in a survey of employers conducted by the Job Accommodation Network (JAN)), and accommodation costs may be offset by the savings associated with employing people with disabilities (higher performance, lower turnover costs). Moreover, organizational interventions that support workplace inclusion of the most vulnerable, such as neurodivergent individuals, are likely to benefit all employees.

Healthcare 
Ableism is prevalent in the many different divisions of healthcare, whether that be in prison systems, the legal or policy side of healthcare, and clinical settings. The following subsections will explore the ways in which ableism makes its way into these areas of focus through the inaccessibility of appropriate medical treatment.

Clinical settings 
Just as in every other facet of life, ableism is present in clinical healthcare settings. A 2021 study of over 700 physicians in the United States found that only 56.5% "strongly agreed that they welcomed patients with disability into their practices." The same study also found that 82.4% of these physicians believed that people with a significant disability had a lower quality of life than those without disabilities. Data from the 1994–1995 National Health Interview Survey-Disability Supplement has shown that those with disabilities have lower life expectancies than those without them. While that can be explained by a myriad of factors, one of the factors is the ableism experienced by those with disabilities in clinical settings. Those with disabilities may be more hesitant to seek care when needed due to barriers created by ableism such as dentist chairs that are not accessible or offices that are filled with bright lights and noises that can be triggering.

In June 2020, near the start of the COVID-19 pandemic, a 46-year-old quadriplegic in Austin, Texas named Michael Hickson was denied treatment for COVID-19, sepsis, and a urinary tract infection and died 6 days after treatment was withheld. His physician was quoted as having said that he had a "preference to treat patients who can walk and talk." The physician also had stated that Hickson's brain injury made him have not much of a quality of life. Several complaints have since been filed with the Texas Office of Civil Rights and many disability advocacy groups have become involved in the case.

Several states, including Alabama, Arizona, Kansas, Pennsylvania, Tennessee, Utah, and Washington allow healthcare providers, in times of crisis, to triage based on the perceived quality of life of the patients, which tends to be perceived as lower for those with disabilities. In Alabama, healthcare providers are allowed to ecclude patients with disabilities who require assistance with various daily tasks from treatment.

Criminal justice settings 
The provision of effective healthcare for people with disabilities in criminal justice institutions is an important issue because the percentage of disabled people in such facilities has been shown to be larger than the percentage in the general population. A lack of prioritization on working to incorporate efficient and quality medical support into prison structures endangers the health and safety of disabled prisoners.

Limited access to medical care in prisons consists of long waiting times to meet with physicians and to consistently receive treatment, as well as the absence of harm reduction measures and updated healthcare protocols. Discriminatory medical treatment also takes place through the withholding of proper diets, medications, and assistance (equipment and interpreters), in addition to failures to adequately train prison staff. Insufficient medical accommodations can worsen prisoners' health conditions through greater risks of depression, HIV/AIDS and Hepatitis C transmission, and unsafe drug injections.

In Canada, the usage of prisons as psychiatric facilities may involve issues concerning inadequate access to medical support, particularly mental health counseling, and the inability of prisoners to take part in decision-making regarding their medical treatment. The usage of psychologists employed by the correctional services organization and the lack of confidentiality in therapeutic sessions also present barriers for disabled prisoners. That makes it more difficult for prisoners with disabilities to express discontentment about problems in the available healthcare since it may later complicate their release from the prison.

In the United States, the population of older adults in the criminal justice system is growing rapidly, but older prisoners' healthcare needs are not being sufficiently met. One specific issue includes a lack of preparation for correctional officers to be able to identify geriatric disability.

Regarding that underrecognition of disability, further improvement is needed in training programs to allow officers to learn when and how to provide proper healthcare intervention and treatment for older adult prisoners.

Healthcare policy 
Ableism has long been a serious concern in healthcare policy, and the COVID-19 pandemic has greatly exaggerated and highlighted the prevalence of this serious concern. Studies frequently show what a "headache" patients with disabilities are for the healthcare system. In a 2020 study, 83.6% of healthcare providers preferred patients without disabilities to those with disabilities. It is important to assess the impact of such views on care for these individuals and healthcare policies. One example is the crisis standards of care. Though these standards have been in place before the COVID-19 pandemic, crisis standards of care have come to the forefront of healthcare policy because of their timely relevance. To maximize space in hospitals, "states, localities, and individual hospitals... explicitly rul[ed] out treatment for people with certain 'pre-existing conditions,' choosing 'healthy' non-disabled people to live, and 'sicker' disabled people to die." This policy is especially concerning since according to the CDC, people with disabilities are at a heightened risk for contracting COVID-19. Additionally, in the second wave of the COVID-19 pandemic in the UK, people with intellectual disabilities were told that they will not be resuscitated if they become ill with COVID-19. These examples illustrate how the devaluation of disabled people's lives is done for logistical reasons and considered ethically sound.

Another policy example that clearly demonstrates ableism is that of ventilator rationing for hospitals during the pandemic. New York State instituted explicit guidelines for the distribution of ventilators and named specific exclusion criteria for access to the ventilators. The criteria were made on the basis of a patient's functional status (presence of disabilitie) and prognosis. Some examples given for functional statuses include recent cardiac arrests, hypotension, and currently needing a ventilator, inter alia.

In England, Scotland and Wales, an abortion may be performed on the basis of the foetus having physical or mental abnormalities.

Education 
Ableism often makes the world inaccessible to disabled people,  especially in schools. Within education systems, the use of the medical model of disability and social model of disability contributes to the divide between students within special education and general education classrooms. Oftentimes, the medical model of disability portrays the overarching idea that disability can be corrected and diminished at the result of removing children from general education classrooms. The model of disability suggests that the impairment is much more important than the person who is helpless and should be separated from those who are not disabled.

The social model of disability, as society slowly becomes more progressive at making changes toward inclusive education, suggests that people with impairments are disabled at the result of the way society acts. When students with disabilities are pulled out of their classrooms into receive the support that they need, that often leads their peers to socially reject them out of the habit of not forming relationships with them in the classroom. By using the social model of disability, inclusive setting based schools where the social norm is not to alienate their peers can promote more teamwork and less division throughout many campuses.

Through implementing the social model of education within modern forms of inclusive education actively provides children of all abilities with the important role of changing discriminatory attitudes within the school system. For example, a disabled student may need to read text instead of listening to a tape recording of the text. In the past, schools have focused too much on fixing the disability, but progressive reforms make schools now focused on minimizing the impact of a student's disability and giving support, skills, and more opportunities to live a full life. Moreover, schools are required to maximize access to their entire community. In 2004, Congress made into law the Individuals with Disabilities Education Act, which states that free and appropriate education is eligible to children with disabilities with insurance of necessary services. Congress later amended the law, in 2015, to include the Every Student Succeeds Act, which guarantees equal opportunity for people with disabilities full participation in society, and the tools for overall independent success.

Media 

Disabilities are not only misrepresented in the media but often underrepresented as well. While roughly 20 percent of the US population is disabled, only 2 percent of characters played in television and film have a disability. 95 percent of the time, disabled characters are played by actors who are not disabled.

These common ways of framing disability are heavily criticized for being dehumanizing and failing to place importance on the perspectives of disabled people.

Disabled villain 
One common form of media depiction of disability is to portray villains with a mental or physical disability. Lindsey Row-Heyveld notes, for instance, "that villainous pirates are scraggly, wizened and inevitably kitted out with a peg leg, eye patch or hook hand, whereas heroic pirates look like Johnny Depp's Jack Sparrow". The disability of the villain is meant to separate them from the average viewer and dehumanize the antagonist. As a result, stigma forms surrounding the disability and the individuals that live with it.

There are many instances in literature where the antagonist is depicted as having a disability or mental illness. Some common examples include Captain Hook, Darth Vader and the Joker. Captain Hook is notorious for having a hook as a hand and seeks revenge on Peter Pan for his lost hand. Darth Vader's situation is unique because Luke Skywalker is also disabled. Luke's prosthetic hand looks lifelike, whereas Darth Vader appears robotic and emotionless because his appearance does not resemble humans and takes away human emotions. The Joker is a villain with a mental illness, and he is an example of the typical depiction of associating mental illness with violence.

Inspiration porn 

Inspiration porn is the use of disabled people performing ordinary tasks as a form of inspiration. Criticisms of inspiration porn say that it distances disabled people from individuals who are not disabled and portrays disability as an obstacle to overcome or rehab.

One of the most common examples of inspiration porn includes the Paralympics. Athletes with disabilities often get praised as inspirational because of their athletic accomplishments. Critics of this type of inspiration porn have said, "athletic accomplishments by these athletes are oversimplified as 'inspirational' because they're such a surprise."

Pitied character 
In many forms of media such as films and articles a disabled person is portrayed as a character who is viewed as less than able, different, and an "outcast." Hayes and Black (2003) explore Hollywood films as the discourse of pity towards disability as a problem of social, physical, and emotional confinement. The aspect of pity is heightened through the storylines of media focusing on the individual's weaknesses as opposed to strengths and therefore leaving audiences a negative and ableist portrayal towards disability.

Supercrip stereotype 
The supercrip narrative is generally a story of a person with an apparent disability who is able to "overcome" their physical differences and accomplish an impressive task. Professor Thomas Hehir's "Eliminating Ableism in Education" gives the story of a blind man who climbs Mount Everest as an example of the supercrip narrative.

The Paralympics are another example of the supercrip stereotype since they generate a large amount of media attention and demonstrate disabled people doing extremely strenuous physical tasks. Although that may appear inspiring at face value, Hehir explains that many people with disabilities view those news stories as setting unrealistic expectations. Additionally, Hehir mentions that supercrip stories imply that disabled people are required to perform those impressive tasks to be seen as an equal and to avoid pity from those without disabilities.

The disability studies scholar Alison Kafer describes how those narratives reinforce the problematic idea that disability can be overcome by an individual's hard work, in contrast to other theories, which understand disability to be a result of a world that is not designed to be accessible. Supercrip stories reinforce ableism by emphasizing independence, reliance on one's body, and the role of individual will in self-cure.

Other examples of the supercrip narrative include the stories of Rachael Scdoris, the first blind woman to race in the Iditarod, and Aron Ralston, who has continued to climb after the amputation of his arm.

Environmental and outdoor recreation media 
Disability has often been used as a short-hand in environmental literature for representing distance from nature, in what Sarah Jaquette Ray calls the "disability-equals-alienation-from-nature trope." An example of this trope can be seen in Moby Dick, as Captain Ahab's lost leg symbolizes his exploitative relationship with nature. Additionally, in canonical environmental thought, figures such as Ralph Waldo Emerson and Edward Abbey wrote using metaphors of disability to describe relationships between nature, technology, and the individual.

Ableism in outdoor media can also be seen in promotional materials from the outdoor recreation industry: Alison Kafer highlights a notable example of ableist outdoor media depiction seen in a Nike advertisement. In 2000, this ad (which can be viewed at this link) ran in eleven outdoor magazines promoting a pair of running shoes. The advertisement was withdrawn after the company received over six hundred complaints in the first two days after its publication, and Nike apologized for publishing it. Kafer notes that the ad is deeply offensive in the way it depicts those with spinal cord injuries and those who use wheelchairs, describing the reader post-spinal injury as a "drooling, misshapen, non-extreme-trail-running husk of [their] former self, forced to roam the Earth in a motorized wheelchair." The language in this ad explicitly draws a connection between the reader's self-identity and happiness with their ability to engage in "extreme trail running" while insulting those who use wheelchairs, and the advertisement's publication reveals Nike's assumptions that readers of outdoor magazines are neither disabled nor allies of the disabled, and that disability prevents encounters with nature.

This ad displays the arrogance of this company, as Nike's ad promises nondisabled runners and hikers the ability to protect their bodies against disability by purchasing this pair of shoes. This framing supports the illusion of a pure, unassisted "extreme" recreation experience that simply does not exist, as all interactions with nature are mediated by technology. At the same time, it conceals the truth that all people exist on a spectrum of disability, as bodies change over time, bodies can be both abled and disabled in different ways, and those who consider themselves abled may only be temporarily so. This campaign serves as an example of a corporation preying on fear of disability to sell their product, showing how deeply ingrained ableism is within the extreme sports and outdoor recreation communities.

Sports

Sports are often an area of society in which ableism is evident. In sports media, disabled athletes are often portrayed to be inferior. When disabled athletes are discussed in the media, there is often an emphasis on rehabilitation and the road to recovery, which is inherently a negative view on the disability. Oscar Pistorius is a South African runner who competed in the 2004, 2008, and 2012 Paralympics and the 2012 Olympic games in London. Pistorius was the first double amputee athlete to compete in the Olympic games. While media coverage focused on inspiration and competition during his time in the Paralympic games, it shifted to questioning whether his prosthetic legs gave him an advantage while competing in the Olympic games.

Types of ableism 
 Physical ableism is hate or discrimination based on physical disability.
 Sanism, or mental ableism, is discrimination based on mental health conditions and cognitive disabilities.
 Medical ableism exists both interpersonally (as healthcare providers can be ableist) and systemically, as decisions determined by medical institutions and caregivers may prevent the exercise of rights from disabled patients like autonomy and making decisions. The medical model of disability can be used to justify medical ableism.
 Structural ableism is failing to provide accessibility tools: ramps, wheelchairs, special education equipments, etc.
 Cultural ableism is behavioural, cultural, attitudinal and social patterns that may discriminate against disabled people, including by denying, dismissing or invisibilising disabled people, and by making accessibility and support unattainable.
 Internalised ableism is a disabled person discriminating against themself and other disabled people by holding the view that disability is something to be ashamed of or something to hide or by refusing accessibility or support. Internalised ableism may be a result of mistreatment of disabled individuals. It is a form of gaslighting from society.
 Hostile ableism is a cultural or social kind of ableism where people are hostile towards symptoms of a disability or phenotypes of the disabled person.
 Benevolent ableism is when people treat the disabled person well but like a child (infantilization), instead of considering them full grown adults. Examples include ignoring disabilities, not respecting the life experiences of the disabled person, microaggression, not considering the opinion of the disabled person in important decision making, invasion of privacy or personal boundaries, forced corrective measures, unwanted help, not listening to the disabled person, etc.
 Ambivalent ableism can be characterized as somewhere in between hostile and benevolent ableism.

Causes of ableism
Ableism may have evolutionary and existential origins (fear of contagion, fear of death). It may also be rooted in belief systems (social Darwinism, meritocracy), language (such as "suffering from" disability), or unconscious biases.

See also 

Disability abuse
Disability and poverty
Disability hate crime
Disability rights movement
Inclusion (disability rights)
Mentalism (discrimination)
Violence against people with disabilities

References

Further reading 
 
 
 
 
 
 
 
 Fandrey, Walter: Krüppel, Idioten, Irre: zur Sozialgeschichte behinderter Menschen in Deutschland (Cripples, idiots, madmen: the social history of disabled people in Germany)  
 
 
 
 
 Schweik, Susan. (2009). The Ugly Laws: Disability in Public (History of Disability). NYU Press.  
 Shaver, James P. (1981). Handicapism and Equal Opportunity: Teaching About the Disabled in Social Studies. Library of Congress Card Catalog Number 80-70737 ERIC Number: ED202185

External links

 Disablism: How to tackle the last prejudice by DEMOS (2004)
 
 

 
Social theories
Social concepts
Prejudice and discrimination by type
Disability rights